Anthusa of Mantinea, also called Anthusa the Confessor, was an anchoress and abbess in Constantinople during the 8th century.

Anthusa became an ascetic at a young age, living in the mountains near Constantinople in complete solitude.  She later founded two monasteries, one for men and the other for women, and became abbess of the monastery for nuns, 90 of whom resided there and who "were known for their obedience to their abbess and for their spiritual discipline".  She openly defied Emperor Constantine V's iconoclastic prohibitions, so she, her nuns, and her nephew, who was abbot of the second monastery, were arrested and tortured.  When Anthusa correctly prophesied that the emperor's wife, who was close to death from childbirth, would safely deliver twins, a boy and a girl, the empress intervened. Anthusa's life was spared, and the empress donated several estates to her.  The empress' daughter was named after Anthusa, educated by her, and also became a saint, founding the first orphanage in the Christian world.

Anthusa returned to her monastery, where she lived to old age.  She died in 759 and was buried in her cell.  Her feast day is July 27.

References 

Year of birth unknown
759 deaths
Greek saints
8th-century Christian saints
Byzantine saints of the Eastern Orthodox Church
Christian abbesses
Byzantine Iconoclasm
Torture victims
Prisoners and detainees of the Byzantine Empire
8th-century Byzantine nuns
Byzantine female saints